Horace Armitage was an English football player and manager who managed Galatasaray between 1908 and 1911. He also played for Fenerbahçe before going to Galatasaray SK. He was one of the founders of Cadi-Keuy.

References

Year of birth missing
Year of death missing
English footballers
English football managers
Fenerbahçe S.K. footballers
Galatasaray S.K. footballers
Galatasaray S.K. (football) managers
Association footballers not categorized by position
English expatriate footballers
English expatriate football managers
English expatriate sportspeople in Turkey
Expatriate football managers in Turkey